The Cathedral of Saint John the Baptist in Prešov is a Greek Catholic cathedral, the seat of Archbishop of Prešov and the metropolitan church of Slovak Greek Catholic Province.
Former eparchy bishops and martyrs Pavol Gojdič and Vasiľ Hopko are buried here. In temple also is the copy of Shroud of Turin.

See also
 List of cathedrals in Slovakia

Eastern Catholic cathedrals in Slovakia
Churches in Prešov Region
14th-century churches in Slovakia